Richard Böhm (1 October 1854 − 27 March 1884) was a German zoologist and explorer.

Life 
Richard Böhm was the son of Ludwig Böhm, a prominent Physician and Franziska Louise (born Franziska Meyerlinck). As a child, he received a copy of Brehms Tierleben for Christmas, which "became a source of unimagined pleasure" for the young Böhm. He studied zoology at the Friedrich Schiller University in Jena with the Darwinist Ernst Haeckel (1834–1919) and attained a doctorate in 1877. His disseration was on Helgoland leptomeduses. In April 1880, he and Paul Reichard went on an expedition to Zanzibar and then, in East Africa, the east bank of Lake Tanganyika and the southeast of Lake Upemba, which he discovered. His correspondence appeared in 1888 under the title Ostafrika, Sansibar und Tanganjika heraus: Von Sansibar zum Tanganjika, Briefe aus Ostafrika von Dr. Richard Böhm (J. A. Brockhaus, Leipzig 1888 Ed. Herman Schalow). Böhm wrote numerous articles in the Journal of Ornithology from 1882 to 1887. He was one of the first zoologists to research the animals between the East-African steppe and West-African forest and discovered numerous new species of birds. He died of an attack of malaria.

Species Named After Böhm 
Anton Reichenow (1847–1941) and Herman Schalow (1852–1925) dedicated bird species to him.

Merops boehmi (Reichenow 1882) 
Sarothrura boehmi (Reichenow 1900) 
Neafrapus boehmi (Schalow 1882) 
Muscicapa boehmi (Reichenow 1884).

References 

German ornithologists
German explorers of Africa
1854 births
1884 deaths
Deaths from malaria
Scientists from Berlin
19th-century German zoologists
University of Jena alumni